Bálint Török de Enying (25 September 1502 in Szigetvár – 1551 in Istanbul) was a Hungarian aristocrat, Ban of Nándorfehérvár (Belgrade), and between 1527–1542 the Lord of Csesznek. He led a rebellion against the Ottoman Empire until he was captured by the Ottomans and taken to Istanbul where he was executed for rebellion against the state.

Sources
Bessenyei József: A Héttorony foglya
(MTA) Magyarország történeti kronológiája (II. kötet)
Bethlen Farkas: Erdély története
Nagy Iván: Magyarország családai czímerekkel és nemzedékrendi táblákkal
Hóman Bálint-Szekfű Gyula: Magyar történet (III. kötet)

Hungarian nobility
Voivodes of Transylvania
1502 births
1551 deaths
Eastern Hungarian Kingdom